Orlanda Amarílis Lopes Rodrigues Fernandes Ferreira, known as Orlanda Amarílis (8 October 1924 – 1 February 2014) was a Cape Verdean writer.  She is considered to be a noteworthy writer of fiction whose main literary themes include perspectives on women’s writing, with depictions of various aspects of the lives of Cape Verdean women as well as depictions of the Cape Verdean diaspora. She has been described as "indisputably one of Cape Verde’s most talented writers".

Biography

Orlanda Amarílis was born in Assomada, Santa Catarina, Cape Verde, on 8 October 1924. Amarílis is the daughter of Armando Napoleão Rodrigues Fernandes and Alice Lopes da Silva Fernandes. In 1945, she married Portuguese-Cape Verdean writer (born in Portugal) Manuel Ferreira, and the couple had two sons, Sérgio Manuel Napoleão Ferreira (born in Cape Verde) e Hernâni Donaldo Napoleão Ferreira (born in Goa). Amarílis belongs to a family of literary figures, including Baltazar Lopes da Silva  and her father, Armando Napoleão Rodrigues Fernandes, who published the first Cape Verdean Creole dictionary in Cape Verde.

In the city of Mindelo, São Vicente island, Cape Verde, Amarílis completed her primary studies, as well as her secondary studies (high school) in the Liceu Gil Eanes, a secondary school today Liceu Ludgero Lima. She then moved to Goa, and lived in the capital, Panaji (Pangim) for  six years where she completed her primary teacher training (Magistério Primário). Years later, she finished two courses in Lisbon: Pedagogical Sciences (Curso de Ciências Pedagógicas) as well as a course of elementary education supervision (inspector do ensino básico.)

For professional reasons as well as for reasons related to her participation in cultural interventions, Amarílis and her husband traveled to various countries including Angola, Canada, Egypt, Goa, Mozambique, Nigeria, Spain, Sudan, and the United States. She traveled worldwide and became a member of the Portuguese Movement Against Apartheid (Movimento Português Contra o Apartheid), the Portuguese Movement for Peace (Movimento Português para a Paz) and the Portuguese Association of Writers (Associação Portuguesa de Escritores (APE)).

Career

Amarílis began her career with her collaboration in the Cape Verdean magazine Certeza in 1944, and many of her short stories were included in various anthologies of Cape Verdean literature. After her work with Certeza, she contributed additional short stories to other magazines such as COLÓQUIO / Letras, África, Loreto 13.  Many of her short stories are translated in Dutch, Hungarian, Italian, and Russian.

Literary works

Short stories
Short story anthologies (Portuguese language)
  Escrita e Combate (1976)
  Contos – O Campo da Palava (1985)
  Fantástico no Feminino (1985)
  Afecto às Letras – Obra Coletiva de Homenangem da Literatura Contemporânea a Jacinto do Prado Coelho (1988)

Short story anthologies (German language)
  Frauen in der Dritten Welt (1986)

Short story anthologies (English language)
  Across the Atlantic: An Anthology of Cape Verdean Literature (1986)
  A New Reader’s Guide to African Literature (1983)

Translations
 "Nina" in Exchanges, Winter 2016.

Short story collections

Cais-do-Sodré té Salamansa (1974)
  Ilhéu dos Pássaros (1983)
  A Casa dos Mastros (1989)

Children's books
 Folha a folha (1987) - coauthored with Maria Alberta Menéres
 Facécias e Peripécias
 A Tartaruguinha [The Little Turtle] (1997)

See also
List of Cape Verdeans
List of Cape Verdean writers
Cape Verdean Creole
Literature of Cape Verde

References

Further reading
Abdala Junior, Benjamin. "Globalização, Cultura e Identidade em Orlanda Amarílis". Portuguese Literary & Cultural Studies (PLCS), Vol. 8 (Spring 2002): 213–26. Print.
Barros, Maria Regina de. "Emigrar é preciso: viver não é preciso". Belo Horizonte: PUC Minas, 2005. 105pp. (Dissertação de Mestrado), Programa de Pós-graduação em Letras).
Charlotte H. Bruner. "Orlanda Amarílis", The Heinemann Book of African Women's Writing, Heinemann, Oxford, 1993, p. 34 
Gérard, Albert. "The Literature of Cape Verde", African Arts, Vol. 1, No. 2 (Winter 1968): 62–64. Print.
McNab, Gregory. "Sexual Difference: The Subjection of Women in Two Stories by Orlanda Amarílis".  Luso-Brazilian Review, Vol. 24, No. 1 (Summer 1987): 59-68. Print.
Tutikian, Jane. Inquietos Olhares: A construção do processo de identidade nacional nas obras de Lídia Jorge e Orlanda Amarílis. São Paulo:  Editora Arte & Ciência, 1999. Print.

External links
 Barros, Maria Regina de, "Emigrar é preciso: viver não é preciso". Belo Horizonte: PUC Minas, 2005. 105p. (Dissertação de Mestrado), Programa de Pós-graduação em Letras).'
 https://web.archive.org/web/20091227172856/http://home.no/tabanka/literature.htm
 [http://www.fflch.usp.br/dlcv/posgraduacao/ecl/pdf/via02/via02_06.pdf ' literatura de migrante], article by Benjamin Abdala Junior at Via Atlântica'', no 2, July 1999, pp. 76–89 
Cotidiano feminino descrito em obras de Orlanda Amarílis e Ivone Aída Ramos, article by Jussara de Oliveira Rodrigues, X SEL/Seminário de estudos literários, 2010, p. 9 

1924 births
2014 deaths
Cape Verdean women writers
Cape Verdean short story writers
Cape Verdean children's writers
Cape Verdean women children's writers
20th-century women writers
People from Santa Catarina, Cape Verde
20th-century short story writers